At least four vessels of the British Royal Navy have been named HMS Lyme:

 , 52-gun third rate. Renamed Montagu in 1660.
 , 20-gun sixth rate. 
 , 24-gun sixth rate.
 , 28-gun sixth rate.

References

Royal Navy ship names